The Lumsden–Boone Building is a historic commercial building located at 226 Fayetteville Street in the Fayetteville Street Historic District of Raleigh, North Carolina, United States.  Constructed in 1896 for tin and hardware dealer J.C.S. Lumsden, the building is the only surviving metal-front building today on Fayetteville Street.  Boone's official business name was "C.R. Boone, DeLuxe Clothier"; his was considered one of the city's leading businesses and boasted the slogan "Come and See". The Lumsden–Boone Building is currently used by a web design company. The building was added to the National Register of Historic Places on September 8, 1983, and was renovated in 1985 and in 2008.

See also
 National Register of Historic Places listings in Wake County, North Carolina

References

Commercial buildings on the National Register of Historic Places in North Carolina
Neoclassical architecture in North Carolina
Commercial buildings completed in 1896
Buildings and structures in Raleigh, North Carolina
National Register of Historic Places in Raleigh, North Carolina